Quiet Killer is a 1992 American made-for-television medical disaster film directed by Sheldon Larry. The thriller, based on the 1977 novel The Black Death by Gwyneth Cravens and John S. Marr and adapted by I. C. Rapoport, stars Kate Jackson and was originally broadcast on CBS. The film was released on VHS under the title Black Death.

Plot
When Sara Dobbs (Robertson), the teenage daughter of a wealthy New York City family returns home while feeling sick, nobody suspects a thing. At home, her health deteriorates quickly, resulting in a painful death on the streets before her Manhattan home. In the hospital, it does not take long before Dr. Nora Hart (Jackson) concludes that Sara has died of the Black Death, which has not occurred in centuries. Realizing that the disease is extremely contagious, she tries to push the authorities to warn the New York citizens, but the Mayor is reluctant to cause a widespread panic. Meanwhile, more citizens who have been in direct contact with Sara start to perish. Nora and her new colleague Dr. Jake Prescott (Nordling)—whom she becomes romantically involved with—start a race against the clock to locate and treat all the people who might be infected, while trying to prevent the city from panicking. In the end, Nora is successful in finding everyone who is infected, and treats most of them successfully. Within a week, a pandemic is ended after 22 deaths.

Cast
Kate Jackson as Dr. Nora Hart
Al Waxman as Mayor Andy Carmichael
Jeffrey Nordling as Dr. Jake Prescott
Chip Zien as Dr. Lionel Katz
Barbara Williams as Charlene
David Hewlett as Nyles Chapman
Jerry Orbach as Dr. Vincent Califano
Howard Hesseman as Congressman Calvin Phillips
Alma Martinez as Dolores Rosales
Tom Mardirosian as Deputy Mayor Kaprow
Kathleen Robertson as Sara Dobbs
Luis Guzmán as Adelaido Ortiz
Don Francks as Dr. Martin

References

External links

1992 television films
1992 films
1990s disaster films
American disaster films
American thriller films
CBS network films
Films set in New York City
Films directed by Sheldon Larry
1990s American films